Inborn errors of amino acid metabolism are metabolic disorders which impair the synthesis and degradation of amino acids.

Types 
Alkaptonuria
Aspartylglucosaminuria
Branched-chain keto acid dehydrogenase kinase deficiency
Methylmalonic acidemia
Maple syrup urine disease
Homocystinuria
Tyrosinemia
Trimethylaminuria
Hartnup disease
Biotinidase deficiency
Ornithine carbamoyltransferase deficiency
Carbamoyl-phosphate synthase I deficiency disease
Citrullinemia
Hyperargininemia
Hyperhomocysteinemia
Hypermethioninemia
Hyperlysinemias
Nonketotic hyperglycinemia
Propionic acidemia
Hyperprolinemia

Amino acid transport disorders
Cystinuria
Dicarboxylic aminoaciduria
Hartnup disease

Amino acid storage disorders
Glutaric acidemia type 2

References

External links